Hamningberg Chapel is a chapel of the Church of Norway in Båtsfjord Municipality in Troms og Finnmark county, Norway. It is located in the now-abandoned (uninhabited) village of Hamningberg. It was an annex chapel for the Båtsfjord parish which is part of the Varanger prosti (deanery) in the Diocese of Nord-Hålogaland. The small, red, wooden chapel was built in a long church style in 1949 by the architect Sverre Poulsen. The church seats about 140 people.

The chapel is no longer regularly used, since the village is no longer inhabited. The area still is used for vacationers in the summer, and the chapel is occasionally used for special events.

Media gallery

See also
List of churches in Nord-Hålogaland

References

Båtsfjord
Churches in Finnmark
Wooden churches in Norway
20th-century Church of Norway church buildings
Churches completed in 1949
1949 establishments in Norway
Long churches in Norway